Allan Worthy (born 1 January 1974) is an English cricketer.  Worthy is a right-handed batsman who bowls right-arm Off break.  He was born at South Hetton, County Durham. He was the first ever to reach 10,000 NEPL runs.

Worthy made his debut in List A cricket for the Durham Cricket Board against the Leicestershire Cricket Board in the 2000 NatWest Trophy.  From 2000 to 2003, he represented the Board in 4 List A matches, the last of which came against Glamorgan in the 2003 Cheltenham & Gloucester Trophy.

Worthy joined Northumberland in 2004, making his debut for the county in the Minor Counties Championship against Cambridgeshire.  From 2004 to 2009, he has represented the county in 28 Championship matches, the last of which came against Buckinghamshire.  Worthy currently represents the county in the MCCA Knockout Trophy.  His debut Trophy match for the county came against Staffordshire in 2004.  From 2004 to present, he has represented the county in 24 Trophy matches.

He also played a single List A match for the county against Middlesex in the 2005 Cheltenham & Gloucester Trophy.  In his 5 career List A matches, he scored 193 runs at a batting average of 38.50, with 3 half centuries  and a high score of 74.  In the field he took 2 catches.

Allan is the all-time leading runscorer in North East Premier league history, was the first to reach 10,000 runs and has scored more centuries than any other player.

References

External links
Allan Worthy at Cricinfo
Allan Worthy at CricketArchive

1974 births
Living people
People from South Hetton
Cricketers from County Durham
English cricketers
Durham Cricket Board cricketers
Northumberland cricketers